Vital Nikolaevich Bulyga (born 12 January 1980) is a football coach and a former player from Belarus. 

He played for the Belarus national football team and scored two goals against Germany in a friendly match on 27 May 2008.

Honours
BATE Borisov
Belarusian Premier League champion: 2009

Career statistics

International

Statistics accurate as of match played 19 November 2008

International goals

References

External links
 

1980 births
Living people
People from Mogilev
Belarusian footballers
Association football forwards
Belarus international footballers
Belarusian expatriate footballers
Expatriate footballers in Russia
Belarusian expatriate sportspeople in Russia
Russian Premier League players
FC Dnepr Mogilev players
PFC Krylia Sovetov Samara players
FC Elista players
FC Amkar Perm players
FC Tom Tomsk players
FC Luch Vladivostok players
FC BATE Borisov players
FC Salyut Belgorod players
FC Shinnik Yaroslavl players
FC Zhemchuzhina Sochi players
FC Orenburg players
FC Belshina Bobruisk players
FC Sakhalin Yuzhno-Sakhalinsk players
FC Dinamo Minsk players
Sportspeople from Mogilev Region